A Dangerous Fortune is a novel written by British author Ken Follett in 1993. The story is set against the backdrop of collapse of a bank in 1866. The book also features Follett's first female villain, the domineering and unscrupulous Augusta.

Summary 
The prologue, set in 1866, depicts the day of the accident. It introduces young college students, the main characters that we find throughout the novel. It also positions the place of each character in society. We also learn of two deaths, that of Peter Middleton and Tobias Pilaster, Hugh's father.

External links
 Ken Follett's A Dangerous Fortune   official site
 A Dangerous Fortune at worldcat.org

1993 British novels
British historical novels
Novels by Ken Follett
Novels set in Iran
Novels set in the 1860s
Novels set in the 1890s
Fiction set in 1866
Fiction set in 1892
Macmillan Publishers books